Hope Gap is a 2019 British drama film written and directed by William Nicholson, adapted from his 1999 play The Retreat from Moscow. The film stars Annette Bening, Bill Nighy, Josh O'Connor, Aiysha Hart, Ryan McKen, Steven Pacey and Nicholas Burns.

Hope Gap had its world premiere at the Toronto International Film Festival on 6 September 2019 and was released in the United Kingdom on 28 August 2020 by Curzon Artificial Eye.

Premise
A family drama of the aftermath of a husband's revelation that he is leaving after 29 years of marriage.

Cast
 Annette Bening as Grace
 Bill Nighy as Edward
 Josh O'Connor as Jamie
 Aiysha Hart as Jess
 Ryan McKen as Dev
 Steven Pacey as Solicitor
 Nicholas Burns as Gary
 Rose Keegan as Receptionist
 Nicholas Blane as Priest
 Sally Rogers as Angela
 Liam Hadfield as Waiter

Production
The project was announced on October 31, 2017, with William Nicholson directing and writing the story, and Annette Bening and Bill Nighy cast to play the husband and wife at the centre of the film.

Pre-production began on June 11, 2018, with principal photography starting on July 10. Filming occurred in Seaford, Sussex.

Release
In May 2019, Roadside Attractions and Screen Media Films acquired US distribution rights to the film. It had its world premiere at the Toronto International Film Festival on 6 September 2019. It was released in the United States on 6 March 2020. It was released in the United Kingdom on 28 August 2020.

Reception

Box office
Hope Gap grossed $104,732 in the United States and Canada and $7,832 in other territories for a worldwide total of $112,564.

Critical response
The website's critical consensus reads, "Annette Bening and Bill Nighy are just about worth the price of admission, but Hope Gap lacks enough depth to really leave an impact." On Metacritic, the film has a weighted average score of 58 out of 100 based on 23 critics, indicating "mixed or average reviews".

References

External links
 
 

2019 films
2019 drama films
British films based on plays
British drama films
Films about divorce
Films scored by Alex Heffes
Films set in East Sussex
Films shot in East Sussex
Films with screenplays by William Nicholson
2010s English-language films
Films directed by William Nicholson
2010s British films